NAALAM, or NUALS Arts And Literary Annual Meet, is the cultural fest of National University of Advanced Legal Studies, Kochi.  
The two-day festival has the participation of about 3000 students from about 150 colleges from across South India, competing on various platforms.  The participants have the opportunity to win cash prizes worth Rs. 1,50,000.

National University of Advanced Legal Studies 
The National University of Advanced Legal Studies(NUALS), Kochi, was established in 2005, taking over from the erstwhile National Institute of Advanced Legal Studies. The University is one of the country’s premier institutes for legal studies and every year churns out law graduates who excel in their chosen fields of specialization. Apart from its focus on academics, NUALS also aims at training students to become responsible citizens with well-rounded personalities. The forums and centers organize events and competitions which add to the cultural scene of the college.

List of competitions
There are various competitions which happen in NAALAM. Some of the prominent ones include 
 Bodhi as the Quiz,
 Drishya as the Photography Competition, 
Alankara as the Fashion Show,
Aarohi the Western Rock Band,
Kurukshetra the Gaming(Fifa, NFS, Most Wanted- Latest versions),
Mudra the Group Dance, 
Liberos as the Street Football(3's Football),
Pulsadeus as the War of DJ's,
Vyaktitva as the Personality Test,
Nidhi as the Treasure Hunt,
Roopaka as the On the Spot Dance. 
Vagyuchda as the Literary Event (JAM, AD-MAD, SHIP-WRECKED)
Thus, NAALAM serves as a perfect platform for the talented individuals to showcase themselves.

Pro Show
Pro show is one of the most important parts of NAALAM, where a prominent rock band give its performance at the end of NAALAM. Prominent bands have featured in the pro show since the inception of the fest.

 2012: Heretics, Light Years Explode
 2013: The Down Troddence
 2014: Skrat

Sponsors
NAALAM, since its inception, has been sponsored by various enthusiastic business houses, both local and national. The most prominent among the sponsors include Itty's, Red FM 93.5, Geojit Financial Services, Heritage Experience Learning, AVT Tea, Emmanual Silks, Josco Jweller's, CRI Pumps  we TV, Nippon Toyota, HPL, Rosebowl, Chicking, State Bank of Travancore, Cannon and Hyundai, Cochin Dent Care, Scoops, Marks & Spencer, MTS India, Decathlon.

References

External links
 
 

Culture of Kochi
Festivals in Kerala
National Law Universities